Martin Hanlin (born September 1959 in Glasgow) is a Scottish musician, manager and radio presenter. Hanlin was part of The Silencers (band). Hanlin is currently the host of The Real McCoy Radio Show on KXRN-LP.

Notable interviews on The Real McCoy Radio Show 
 Candy Dulfer
 Sheryl Crow
 Indochine
 The Silencers
 ZZ Top
 Jim Kerr of Simple Minds
 Paul Buchanan of The Blue Nile 
 Mike Peters of The Alarm

References

Scottish rock drummers
British male drummers
Musicians from Glasgow
Living people
The Silencers (band) members
1959 births